Marcus of Viterbo (1304–1369) was an Italian Franciscan. He became Minister General of his order in 1359, a papal legate, and in 1366 a Cardinal.

He died of plague. A monument to him is in the Chiesa di S. Francesco in Viterbo.

References
Giorgio Aquilina (1971), Marco da Viterbo (1304-1369), Ministro generale dei frati minori, cardinale e nunzio apostolico

Notes

External links
Biography

1304 births
1369 deaths
Italian Franciscans
14th-century Italian cardinals
Franciscan cardinals
Diplomats of the Holy See
14th-century deaths from plague (disease)
14th-century Italian Christian monks
Ministers General of the Order of Friars Minor
People from Viterbo